The Intruder is a 2017 Italian drama film directed by Leonardo Di Costanzo. It was screened in the Directors' Fortnight section at the 2017 Cannes Film Festival.

Cast
 Marcello Fonte
 Raffaella Giordano

References

External links
 

2017 films
2017 drama films
2010s Italian-language films
Italian drama films
2010s Italian films